"(Can't You) Trip Like I Do" is a reworking of "Trip Like I Do", a song featured on The Crystal Method's debut album Vegas.  The track was recorded for the 1997 film adaptation of the Spawn comic book series.  The song was co-written by Richard Patrick and co-produced by Brian Liesegang, both from Filter who also appeared in the song's video.  "(Can't You) Trip Like I Do" is the opening song on the film's soundtrack release, Spawn: The Album and is heard in the end credits. The song was also used for the theatrical trailer of The Matrix and promotional trailers for the Enter the Matrix video game but it does not appear in the film or on the soundtrack.

Inspiration for the song came from a friend of Scott Kirkland who was using ecstasy and leaving voice mail messages telling him "I wish you could trip like I do."

Track listing 

(Can't You) Trip Like I Do (Album Version) - 4:25
(Can't You) Trip Like I Do (Danny Saber Remix) - 3:39
(Can't You) Trip Like I Do (Instrumental) - 4:25
(Can't You) Trip Like I Do - 7:35

Chart positions

Credits 
Tracks 1-3: written, recorded and produced by The Crystal Method and Filter.
Mixed by Ben Grosse. Filter appears courtesy of Reprise Records.
The Crystal Method appears courtesy of S3.

Track 1 - Executive Producer and Artist Manager: Richard Bishop for 3 A.M.
Track 2 - Remix and additional production by Danny Saber.
Track 4 - Written by K. Jordan/S. Kirkland. Produced and mixed by The Crystal Method.

Track 1 - Taken from /2&3 Special versions adapted from the Immortal/Epic release Spawn: The Album.
Track 4 - Taken from the S3 release Vegas.

References

1997 singles
Filter (band) songs
The Crystal Method songs
Music videos directed by Floria Sigismondi
1997 songs
Epic Records singles